Robert "Bob" Walsh (September 20, 1940  January 23, 2017) was an American television producer, marketing executive, sports executive, business consultant, and humanitarian.

Early life
Walsh was born on September 20, 1940 in Winthrop, Massachusetts. He attended Marietta College, graduating in 1962 with a degree in radio, television and journalism.

Career
Walsh was a television director and cameraman at WTAP-TV in Parkersburg, West Virginia from 1961 to 1963. He was Program Director of WNAC in Boston from 1963 to 1967. He was a producer of the Al Capp syndicated television show (RKO General) and Program Director of KABC Radio in Los Angeles from 1967 to 1973. At KABC he programmed shows hosted by Regis Philbin, Patty Morrow (Peyton Place), Mr. Blackwell, Keith Jackson, David Cassidy, Marv Gray, Bob Arthur, Army Archerd, Robert Vaughn (Man from U.N.C.L.E.) and Maureen Reagan and guest regulars William Shatner, Merlin Olson and Jim Drury (The Virginian). In 1971 he hired journalist Joe Ortiz, the first Mexican American to ever host an English-language talk show on a commercial radio station. He also hired NBA player Bill Russell to host a two-hour talk show. Two years later Russell left Los Angeles to become Coach and General Manager of the Seattle SuperSonics and brought Walsh with him as Assistant General Manager. Walsh stayed with the team until 1976.

In 1976, Walsh began to represent professional athletes, including Matt Millen, Jim Zorn, Steve Largent, Steve Raible, Sam McCullum, Mike Guman and Ray Horton of the NFL, marketing for coaches Lenny Wilkens, Bill Russell and Jack Ramsey, movie producer Stanley Kramer, and Olympic gold medalists Tracie Ruiz (synchronized swimming) and Olga Korbut of the Soviet Union (gymnastics).

Walsh has also produced many major sporting events, and has been credited by the NCAA for starting the March Madness celebration in 1984 in Seattle when he was Executive Director of the Final Four Host Committee. He also served as Executive Director of 1989 NCAA Men's Final Four; 1988 and 1989 Women's Final Four; 1987 NBA All-Star Game; and 1987 and 1988 NCAA West Regionals (basketball). His company, Bob Walsh Enterprises, was responsible for the 1995 successful bid for the Vancouver Grizzlies franchise in the National Basketball Association.

Walsh is currently involved in OneWorld Now!, a non-profit organization uniting unemployed youth (15–25) with businesses worldwide and is a member of the team of Ross Shafer Consultants, an international consulting and speaking organization whose purpose is to help corporations remain relevant and successful.

Humanitarian efforts
Walsh is probably best known for his international diplomatic and humanitarian efforts.

Goodwill Games
He partnered with TBS founder Ted Turner and the Ministry of Radio and Television (Gosteleradio) and the Ministry of Sports (Goskomsport) of the USSR during the Cold War to produce the 1990 Goodwill Games, which Turner started in 1986 because of the boycotts of the 1980 and 1984 Olympics. The summer-long 1990 Goodwill Games in Seattle and the Northwest Region of the US included 54 countries and 23 sports. It also presented a major arts and cultural program, which included the Bolshoi Ballet, Moscow Circus, combined Moscow-Seattle Opera's presentation of War and Peace, and combined USSR and Seattle Symphony presentation. Approximately 2,000 citizens of the Soviet Union lived in homes with Americans through a Rotary International program. Turner and Soviet television broadcast the event in the US and throughout the Soviet Union. The Goodwill Games was the largest exchange in the history of the United States and the USSR.

Other
In 1991 he partnered with Russian entrepreneurs and cosmonauts to launch a capsule on a Soyuz rocket from the Plesetsk Cosmodrome in Russian into orbit for 7 days. The capsule landed off the coast of Washington and now resides in the Boeing Museum of Flight. The mission is believed to be the first commercial space flight in history.

Walsh also worked in humanitarian activities in Belarus, Russia and the Republic of Georgia during and after the Cold War and brought dozens of young people to the United States for major medical operations. He brought the first major western investment to Georgia resulting in the development of the Marriott Tbilisi Hotel, Marriott Courtyard, office buildings and an ice cream factory in Tbilisi, the Georgian capital. He directed the first western relief efforts at the request of Soviet General Secretary Gorbachev after the 1988 Armenian earthquake, the first time American citizens and aircraft were allowed behind the Iron Curtain without visas since World War II. He negotiated with USSR Minister of Sports Marat Gramov and Deputy Minister Alexander Kozlovsky for the historic swim of the Bering Strait by cold-water swimmer Lynne Cox in 1987 and the Earth Day 20 International Peace Climb of Mt. Everest by Chinese, Soviet, and American climbers led by Jim Whittaker.

Awards and memberships
Walsh received the Supreme Soviet Award from the Chairman of the USSR for his humanitarian activities during the Cold War and has been named an "Honorary Citizen of the Republic of Georgia" by former President Eduard Shevardnadze. He also received the World Affairs Council award in 1990, Washington Man of the Year Award; Marietta College Distinguished Alumnus Award; and the "Abe Lincoln Award" for producing a groundbreaking 24-hour broadcast on "Homosexuality" on ABC Radio.

He has served as Chairman of the Board of the Russian American Foundation for Economic Cooperation; as a Board Member of the Sugar Ray Robinson Youth Foundation; is Founding Chairman and current member of the Board of One World Now; was a member of the Pasadena Tournament of Roses Committee, and Chairman of the Board of the Seattle Convention and Visitors Bureau. He has been credited with the successful marketing of the "Emerald City" nickname for Seattle.

Death 
Walsh died on January 23, 2017 in Istanbul, Turkey following a respiratory infection contracted while traveling in Tbilisi, Georgia.

References

Sources
 *  pages 59–60; 61-70.
 
  
 
 
  Pages 252, 253

External links
Bob Walsh's Huffington Post weblog
http://www.rossshafer.com
http://www.bobwalsh.com
http://www.oneworldnow.org
http://www.visitseattle.org
https://web.archive.org/web/20130718003519/http://onwowo.org/

People from Winthrop, Massachusetts
1940 births
2017 deaths
Marietta College alumni